Zenoa is a genus of beetles in the family Callirhipidae, containing a single described species, Zenoa picea. The species was described by Palisot de Beauvois in 1805.

References

Callirhipidae
Monotypic Elateriformia genera
Beetles described in 1805